Stanovi may refer to:

 Stanovi (Brčko), a village in Bosnia and Herzegovina
 Stanovi (Doboj), a village in Bosnia and Herzegovina
 Stadion Stanovi, a football stadium in Zadar, Croatia